The Duke of York is a title of nobility in the peerage of the United Kingdom.

Duke of York may also refer to:

Places

Antarctica
 Duke of York Island (Antarctica)

Canada
 Duke of York Archipelago
 Duke of York Bay

Papua New Guinea
 Duke of York Islands
 Duke of York Island, Papua New Guinea
 Duke of York Rural LLG

Inns and pubs
 Duke of York, Bloomsbury, England
 Duke of York Inn, Elton, England
 The Duke of York, Fitzrovia, England
 Duke of York, Ganwick Corner, England
 Duke of York, Leysters, England
 Duke of York Inn, Toronto, Canada

Schools
 Duke of York's Royal Military School, Dover, Kent, United Kingdom
 Duke of York School, Nairobi, Kenya, renamed Lenana School after Kenya attained independence in 1963

Other
 Duke of York, an 1897 GWR 3031 Class locomotive built for the British Great Western Railway
 Duke of York (ship) the name of numerous ships